Opostega chordacta is a moth of the family Opostegidae. It was described by Edward Meyrick in 1915. It is known from Queensland in Australia.

Adults have been recorded in November.

References

Opostegidae
Moths described in 1915